Marcus Lee Hansen (December 8, 1892 – May 11, 1938) was an American historian, who won the 1941 Pulitzer Prize for History for The Atlantic Migration, 1607–1860 (1940).

Biography
Hansen was born in Neenah, Wisconsin. He was one of eight children born to Danish immigrant Marcus Hansen (1851-1917) and Norwegian immigrant Gina O Lee Hansen (1854-1920). He received a BA from Central College, an MA from the University of Iowa, and a PhD from Harvard University, where he studied under Frederick Jackson Turner. He was Associate Professor of History (1928–30) and Professor of History (1930–38) at the University of Illinois at Urbana-Champaign.

Hansen was a member of the Board of Editors of the Norwegian-American Historical Association. He conducted research on the history of immigration to the United States. After winning a two-year grant, he studied migration records in Europe for several years.
He died on May 11, 1938 at the age of 45 in Redlands, California of chronic nephritis.

Work and publications
Hansen was an important historian of American immigration. In a 1938 essay, "The Problem of the Third Generation Immigrant", he first presented what he called "the principle of third generation interest": "What the son wishes to forget the grandson wishes to remember". This hypothesis suggests that ethnicity is preserved among immigrants, weakens among their children, and returns with their grandchildren. Children of immigrants tend to reject the foreign ways of their parents, including their religion, and want to join the American mainstream, but the next generation wants to retain the values of their ancestors. The religion of the first generation immigrant, which the second generation rejects, may be reaffirmed by the third generation. Hansen's hypothesis, which became popularized as "Hansen's law", led to much research. Most has shown that although the third generation retains some ethnic identity, there is not a return to ancestral cultural practices among later generations.

Hansen's most well-known works were The Atlantic Migration, 1607–1860: A History of the Continuing Settlement of the United States (posthumous, 1940) and The Immigrant in American History (posthumous, 1940). The former was a study of the factors that encouraged emigration among Europeans in the period before the Civil War, and was based on three years of research in European archives.

Although he specialized in American immigration history, he wrote on other subjects, including Old Fort Snelling, 1819–1858 (1918), Welfare Campaigns in Iowa (1920), Welfare Work in Iowa (1921), and The Mingling of the Canadian and American Peoples (posthumous, 1940).

Recognition
Hansen was posthumously awarded the 1941 Pulitzer Prize for History for The Atlantic Migration, 1607–1860: A History of the Continuing Settlement of the United States, which was published in 1940 by Harvard University Press after historian Arthur M. Schlesinger, Sr. turned his rough draft into a polished manuscript.

References

Bibliography

Further reading
Greene, Victor R. "Marcus Hansen as Historian". Midcontinent American Studies Journal, Vol. 8, No. 2 (Fall 1967), pp. 26–32. 

 Qualey, Carlton C. "Marcus Lee Hansen". Midcontinent American Studies Journal, Vol. 8, No. 2 (Fall 1967), pp. 18–25.
 Spear, Allan H. "Marcus Lee Hansen and the Historiography of Immigration". The Wisconsin Magazine of History, Vol. 44, No. 4 (Summer, 1961), pp. 258–268.

External links
 
 
 

1892 births
1938 deaths
20th-century American historians
American male non-fiction writers
Harvard University alumni
Historians of the United States
University of Illinois Urbana-Champaign faculty
University of Iowa alumni
People from Neenah, Wisconsin
Pulitzer Prize for History winners
Writers from California
Writers from Illinois
Writers from Iowa
American people of Danish descent
American people of Norwegian descent
Central College (Iowa) alumni
Deaths from nephritis
20th-century American male writers
Historians from Wisconsin